The 1951 Yugoslav Women's Basketball League is the 7th season of the Yugoslav Women's Basketball League, the highest professional basketball league in Yugoslavia for women's. Championships is played in 1951 and played six teams. Champion for this season is Crvena zvezda.

Table

External links
 History of league

Yugoslav Women's Basketball League seasons
Women
1951 in women's basketball
basketball